Ubisa is a small village and a medieval monastic complex in Georgia, particularly in the region Imereti, some 25 km from the town Kharagauli.

The monastic complex of Ubisi comprises a 9th-century St. George’s Monastery founded by St. Gregory of Khandzta, a 4-floor tower (AD 1141), fragments of a 12th-century defensive wall and several other buildings and structures.

The monastery houses a unique cycle of murals from the late 14th century by the medieval Georgian painter mononymously known as Damiane.

The monastery is also known for its honey made by the monks.

Mural gallery

External links 

 Ubisi photos
 Murals from Ubisi
 Travels in Georgia

Populated places in Kharagauli Municipality
Georgian Orthodox monasteries
Immovable Cultural Monuments of National Significance of Georgia